Máximo de Meana y Guridi (ca. 1840 – ca. 1912) was a Spanish soldier and Mayor of Ponce, Puerto Rico, from 28 September 1882 until 31 May 1884. Meana y Guridi was interim mayor of Ponce from 28 September 1882 until 2 February 1883, and then mayor from 2 February 1883 until 31 May 1884. As a Spanish Army soldier, Maximo de Meana y Guridi held the rank of Lt. Colonel.

Background

Meana Guridi is remembered more by something he did as a soldier than as a mayor: the design and building of the Main Pavilion of the 1882 Feria Exposición de Ponce, today Museo Parque de Bombas. He designed and built it because, besides being a soldier, Meana was also a professional architect.  In addition, he oversaw the construction  of the (now removed) kiosko árabe on Plaza Degetau, which was also an important building during the Exposición.

Mayoral term
Puerto Rico's Spanish governor General Segundo de la Portilla Gutierrez appointed Meana y Guridi to replace mayor Andrés Caparrós García who had left Ponce to serve as mayor of San Juan.  The appointment was the result of suggestions made to the governor by members of the Ponce Municipal Assembly, after they had been positively impacted by Meana Guridi's involvement in the 1882 Feria Exposición de Ponce for which Meana had not only designed its Main Pavilion (now Parque de Bombas) but had also taken active part in the planning and operation of the Exposición itself as well.  Meana Guridi completed Caparrós García's term, which expired on 2 February 1882, as alcalde delegado (interim mayor).  On 2 February 1882, Meana Guridi then officially became mayor of the city, a post he held until 31 May 1884.

On 16 October 1882, the following were members of Meana's Municipal Council:
Acisclo Subirá
Fabriciano Fernández
Antonio Pérez Guerra
Bartolomé Mayol
Juan Príncipe
R. Aquiles Colón
Ramón Rivera
Juan Seix
Fructuoso Bustamante
Mariano Vidal
Ignacio Bassedas
J. Mirandez
Juan Tur
F. Marzan

Three events marked Meana's mayoralty in Ponce. The first one occurred on 2 January 1883, as he was entering into his first official term as non-interim mayor.  On that date, during the official Municipal Council session, as the Municipal budget was being presented he increased the mayor's salary to $3,000 pesos, and increase approved unanimously by the Council, except for one member named Jose Joaquin Vargas.

That same year, on 3 October, he also terminated the Secretario Municipal (Municipal Clerk), Joaquin Calvo, reportedly based on non-factual gossip hearsay information. In addition to working under Meana, Calvo had worked under five other mayors (Serafín Donderis, Juan José Cartagena, Lucas Jiménez, José Mirelis, and Andrés Caparrós y García) as Secretario of the ayuntamiento, a position he had held since 1876. The third event was the scandal that came to the surface upon Meana firing Secretario Calvo.  It was reported that Meana had a close friendship with the wife of a magistrate, Baron de Gracia Real, in whose house Meana lived. Upon the sudden death of Baron Gracia Real, Meana resigned his mayoral post, married the widow, and disappeared.

Death
Meana died of malaria while in Rome.

Notes

References

See also
 List of mayors of Ponce, Puerto Rico

Mayors of Ponce, Puerto Rico
1840s births
1910s deaths
Year of birth uncertain
Year of death uncertain
Deaths from malaria